is a Japanese actor, voice actor and narrator. While he went to a College of Art, Nihon University, he started his career as a stage actor, but after he moved to Mausu Promotion, his current agency, he came to focus on voice acting.

Filmography

Television animation
1995
Virtua Fighter, Chris

1996
Chōja Reideen, Leaper
You're Under Arrest, Tower Employee B
The Vision of Escaflowne, Gaddes
Midori no Makibao, Fried Chicken

1997
Virus Buster Serge, Captain Rick, Man A, Petri's Subordinate B, Simon
Berserk, Bartender, Sir Laban
YAT Anshin! Uchu Ryokou, Boss, Man A
Flame of Recca, Hanabishi Shigeo, Homura, Kondō, Narrator, Setsuna

1998
Gasaraki, Gowa Operator, Kiou Watanabe, Kiyomu Yonetani, Takeharu Gowa, Tatsumi Wakisaka
Shadow Skill, Zal Zachary
Neo Ranga, Makoto Kageyama

1999
Kakyuusei, Haruhiko Satake
Kyoro-chan, Dementon, Maya's Father
The Big O, The Thug
Power Stone, Okuto
Detective Conan, Ryuichi Arai, Masayoshi Sato, Tatsuzo Genda, Delivery Man
Shukan Storyland, Dream Boy, Announcer

2000
Saiyuki, Crowman

2001
Baki the Grappler, Igari
Cyborg 009 The Cyborg Soldier, Cyborg 0011
Super GALS! Kotobuki Ran, Yamada
Hajime no Ippo, Kida
Figure 17, Shinichi Ibaragi
Rune Soldier, Dandy

2002
Mobile Suit Gundam SEED, Lt. Cdr Biddaulph, Uzumi Nara Athha
Ghost in the Shell: Stand Alone Complex, Saito
The Twelve Kingdoms, Kaname's Father, Kyōki, Shōkō
Patapata Hikōsen no Bōken, William F. Buxton

2003
Kino's Journey, Trucker
Transformers: Armada, Convoy, Scourge
Fullmetal Alchemist, Roy Mustang
Zatch Bell, Circus Director
Papuwa, Hijikata Toshizō
Planetes, Norman
Rockman.EXE Axess, Bowlman

2004
Mobile Suit Gundam SEED Destiny, Uzumi Nara Athha
Kyo kara Maoh!, Hiscreif
Ghost in the Shell: Stand Alone Complex 2nd GIG, Saito
Burst Angel, Wanted Man
Fantastic Children, Tooma's Father, Ude
Black Jack, Doctor
Pokémon Advance, Suzumura

2005
The Law of Ueki, Diego Star
Gaiking: Legend of Daikū-Maryū, Captain Garis, Buby, Daiya's Father, Doctor Two
Gallery Fake, Keiji Takakura
Ginga Densetsu Weed, John
Doraemon, Nobita Nobi (adult), Snowman
Trinity Blood, William Walter Wordsworth
Honey and Clover, Mario Fujiwara
Blood+, James Ironside
Futakoi Alternative, Ainosuke Futaba
Shinshaku Sengoku Eiyu Densetsu, Kosuke Anayama
Sōkyū no Fafner - Single Program - Right of Left-, Tsukasa Saotome
Fushigiboshi no Futago Hime, Wohl

2006
Innocent Venus, Maximas Drake
Utawarerumono, Inkara, Sasante
Angel Heart, Sōchin's Father
Glass Fleet, Jirad, Theodoric
Ginyuu Mokushiroku Meine Liebe wieder, Director Werner
Kekkaishi, Tatsumi Minō
Pumpkin Scissors, Ranke
Kenichi: The Mightiest Disciple, Kozo Ukita
Higurashi When They Cry, Jirō Tomitake
Megaman Star Force, Dragon Sky

2007
El Cazador de la Bruja, Antonio
Oh! Edo Rocket, Kinshirō Tōyama
Gegege no Kitarō, Mitsuo Nezu, Miage-Nyūdō
Koutetsu Sangokushi, Unchō Sekiwa
Ghost Hound, Yasuhiro Nakajima, Narrator
Sky Girls, Tenzen Sakurano
Nodame Cantabile, Tatsuo Noda
Higurashi no Naku Koroni Kai, Jirō Tomitake
Magical Girl Lyrical Nanoha StrikerS, Genya Nakajima
Moonlight Mile, Deputy Director Gainsbourg
Moyashimon, Ryūta
Romeo × Juliet, Giovanni

2008
Amatsuki, Fire Rat, Tadajirō Sasaki
Gunslinger Girl: Il Teatrino, Lieutenant Colonel Military Policeman
Kurozuka, Hasegawa
Code Geass: Lelouch of the Rebellion R2, Commanding Officer
Corpse Princess, Hazama
Soul Eater, Death Scythe
Birdy the Mighty: Decode, Anchorman
Neo Angelique Abyss, Nyx
Neo Angelique Abyss -Second Age-, Nyx
Web Ghost PiPoPa, Theodore
Hakaba Kitarō, Mizuki
Earl and Fairy, Professor Carlton
Macross Frontier, Elmo Kridanik, Jeffrey Wilder, Narrator
Blade of the Immortal, Saburō Anotsu
Fireball, Gedächtnis

2009
Slap Up Party: Arad Senki, Linus
CANAAN, Cummings
Guin Saga, Lunan
Sasameki Koto, Tenkai Murasame
Corpse Princess: Kuro, Hazama
Sengoku Basara: Samurai Kings, Ieyasu Tokugawa
Sora no Manimani, Sayo's Father
The Book of Bantorra, Mattalast
Tears to Tiara, Arawn
Hajime no Ippo: New Challenger, Kida
Pandora Hearts, Leader, Oz's father
Modern Magic Made Simple, Company President

2010
Zakuro, Village Chief
Katanagatari, Mutsue Yasuri
Gokyōdai Monogatari,  Shōichirō Yamanaka
Shiki, Toshio Ozaki
The Qwaser of Stigmata, Shin'ichirō Ōtori
Durarara!!, Kazutawno
Hakuōki, Isami Kondō
Hakuōki: Record of the Jade Blood, Isami Kondō

2011
Un-Go, Minami Motoyama
Gosick, Bryan Roscoe
Suite Precure, Sōsuke Minamino
Sacred Seven, Onigawara
Softenni, Monjūrō Sawanatsu
Battle Spirits: Heroes, Keisuke Saimon
Fireball Charming, Gedächtnis
Blade, Hayate
Manyū Hiken-chō, Hatomune Mie

2012
AKB0048, Nagisa's Father
Btooom!, Kiyoshi Taira
Campione!, Susanō
Hakuōki Reimeiroku, Isami Kondō
Horizon in the Middle of Nowhere II, Christopher Hutton, Walter Raleigh
Is This a Zombie? of the Dead, Demon Baron
JoJo's Bizarre Adventure, Narrator
Little Busters!, Kojirō Kamikita
Moyashimon Returns, Ryōta
Muv-Luv Alternative: Total Eclipse, Commander Yamaguchi
Naruto Spin-Off: Rock Lee & His Ninja Pals, Narrator
The Pet Girl of Sakurasou, Sorata's Father
Sengoku Collection, Fasad 29
Sword Art Online, Heathcliff
Upotte!!, Garland, Narrator

2013
Aikatsu!, Maya Yumekōji
Cuticle Detective Inaba, Don Valentino
Dog & Scissors, Fumio Honda
Koroshiya-san, Police Sergeant
Kotoura-san, Isao Onozaki
Samurai Flamenco, Jun Harazuka
Silver Spoon, Tamako's Father
Star Blazers 2199, Vals Lang
Sword Art Online: Extra Edition, Heathcliff
Tanken Driland, Wilderness Samurai Wilde

2014
Akatsuki no Yona: Yona of the Dawn, King Hiryū
Aldnoah.Zero, Saazbaum
Hanayamata, Naomasa Sekiya
The Irregular at Magic High School, Harunobu Kazama
JoJo's Bizarre Adventure: Stardust Crusaders, Narrator
Nobunaga The Fool, Mitsutsuna
Noragami, Tenjin
Space Dandy, Vestian
Sengoku Basara: Judge End, Tokugawa Ieyasu
Tokyo Ghoul, Kureo Mado
Your Lie in April, Mr. Miyazono

2015
Aldnoah.Zero 2, Saazbaum
Chaos Dragon, Kurama, Reikōretsu
Concrete Revolutio, Uru
Gunslinger Stratos, Srinivasa
JoJo's Bizarre Adventure: Stardust Crusaders Egypt Arc, Narrator
Mr. Osomatsu, ESP Kitty
Noragami Aragato - Tenjin
One Piece, Sengoku (episodes 703+)
The Heroic Legend of Arslan, Karlarn
The Rolling Girls, Kishō Ōtomo
Tokyo Ghoul √A, Kureo Madō
World Break: Aria of Curse for a Holy Swordsman, Tarō Tanaka

2016
Active Raid, Yasuharu Funasaka
Boku Dake ga Inai Machi, Makoto Sawada
JoJo's Bizarre Adventure: Diamond is Unbreakable, Narrator
Nobunaga no Shinobi, Shibata Katsuie
March Comes in like a Lion, Masachika Kouda
Mobile Suit Gundam: Iron-Blooded Orphans, Rustal Elion
Re:Zero − Starting Life in Another World, Russell Fellow
Time Travel Girl, William Gilbert

2017
ACCA: 13-ku Kansatsu-ka, Spade
Fate/Apocrypha, Gordes Musik Yggdmillennia
Angel's 3Piece!, Masayoshi Sawatari
March Comes in like a Lion 2nd Season, Masachika Kouda
100% Pascal-sensei, Heart Technology Pascal (ep. 21)
Elegant Yokai Apartment Life, Keiji Hase

2019
Boogiepop and Others, Kyōichiro Teratsuki
JoJo's Bizarre Adventure: Golden Wind, Narrator

2020
Higurashi: When They Cry – Gou, Jirō Tomitake

2021
Higurashi: When They Cry – Sotsu, Jirō Tomitake
Sonny Boy, Voice

2022
Utawarerumono: Mask of Truth, Dekopompo

Original video animation (OVA)
Legend of the Galactic Heroes (1997), Mattohēfā
Geobreeders (1998), Hound Yoda
Weiss Kreuz (1998), Persia
.hack//Liminality Volume 1 (2003), Doctor Makino
Final Fantasy VII Advent Children (2005), Rufus Shinra
Mobile Suit Gundam: The Origin (2017), Tianem

Original animation DVD (OAD)
Akatsuki no Yona: Yona of the Dawn (2016), King Hiryū

Original net animation (ONA)
A.I.C.O. -Incarnation- (2018), Susumu Kurose
Ghost in the Shell: SAC 2045 (2020–22), Saito
Hanma Baki - Son of Ogre (2021), George Bosch
JoJo's Bizarre Adventure: Stone Ocean (2021–22), Narrator

Theatrical animation
Atashin'chi (????), Executive Secretary
Final Fantasy VII Advent Children (2005), Rufus
Mobile Suit Zeta Gundam A New Translation I: Heirs to the Stars (????), Apolly Bay
No Game, No Life Zero, Ivan Zell
Fullmetal Alchemist the Movie: Conqueror of Shamballa (2005), Roy Mustang
009 Re:Cyborg (2012), Albert Heinrich
Saezuru Tori wa Habatakanai – The Clouds Gather (2020) (Misumi)

Video games

ZombiU (Japanese dub)

Web animation
Puchimas! Petit Idolmaster (2012), Narrator, Basilisk, Yamata no Orochi (Five - Eight)
Puchimas! PetitPetit Idolmaster (2014), Narrator, Basilisk, Supepapupu, Pointy Hair Male, Dog (♂)

Unknown date
Advance Guardian Heroes, Ginjirō
Bloody Roar 4, Stun
Bravely Second, Nikolai Nikolanikov
Dawn of Mana, Masked Guru
Double Score CosmosxCamellia, Shirosaki Rio
Fire Emblem Awakening, Avatar
Gakuen Heaven 2: Double Scramble (2014), Sojiro Sakaki
Hakuoki Shinsengumi Kitan, Kondo Isami
Hakuoki Zuisouroku, Kondo Isami
Hakuoki Yugiroku, Kondo Isami
JoJo's Bizarre Adventure, Joseph Joestar
Kingdom Hearts II, Iago
Lamento -BEYOND THE VOID-, Kaltz
Max Payne, B.B. (Japanese dub)
Meitantei Pikachu: Shin Konbi Tanjō, Pikachu
One Piece: Unlimited World Red, Sengoku
Onimusha, Tokichiro Kinoshita
Onimusha: Dawn of Dreams, Toyotomi Hideyoshi
Ratchet & Clank, Clank (Japanese dub)
Root Double: Before Crime*After Days, Keiji Ukita
Samurai Shodown VI, Kibagami Genjuro, Liu Yunfei and Yagyu Jubei
Sengoku Basara series, Tokugawa Ieyasu
Shinobido: Way of the Ninja, Kabuto
Sin and Punishment: Sora no Kōkeisha, Deco Gekishō
Soulcalibur: Broken Destiny, Nathaniel "Rock" Adams
Spyro the Dragon, Dragon Voice
Star Ocean: Till the End of Time, Norton
Super Robot Wars Original Generation Gaiden, Mizal Touval
Super Robot Wars series, Jeffrey Wilder
Tales of Destiny, Daris
Tales of Xillia 2, Julius Will Kresnik
Tenchu: Stealth Assassins, Rikimaru
Tenchu: Wrath of Heaven, Rikimaru
The Witcher 3: Wild Hunt, Avallac'h (Japanese dub)

Drama CDs
 
Abazure, Kaname Kōzuki
Ai no Kusabi, Iason Mink
Are you Alice?, The Queen of Hearts
Fushigi Yūgi Genbu Kaiden, Einosuke Okuda
Turning Point, Endō
Karneval, The Mysterious Man
Koi Dorobou o Sagase!, Yūji Ōkawa
Taiyō no Ie, Kaitō Motomiya
Tekken, Yoshimitsu
Wakakusa Monogatari ~Kami Hikōki ni Notte~, Narrator
Yasashikute Toge ga Aru, Hayato Takashina
Yume Musubi, Koi Musubi, Ryōmei Kōsaka
Yume wa Kirei ni Shidokenaku, Mido

Tokusatsu
Seijuu Sentai Gingaman (1998), Grinjii (ep. 12)
Kamen Rider Den-O (2007), Snowman Imagin (ep. 45)
Kamen Rider Kiva: King of the Castle in the Demon World (2008), Mummy Legendorga
Zyuden Sentai Kyoryuger (2013), Deboth Chaos (ep. 44)/Butterfly Absolute God Deboth (eps. 45 - 48)

Dubbing

Live-action
12 Angry Men, Juror #6 (James Gandolfini)
The Adventures of Elmo in Grouchland, Oscar the Grouch
A.I. Artificial Intelligence, Gigolo Joe (Jude Law)
Alice in Wonderland, Thackery Earwicket, the March Hare (Paul Whitehouse)
Alice Through the Looking Glass, Thackery Earwicket, the March Hare (Paul Whitehouse)
Alien: The Director's Cut, Parker (Yaphet Kotto)
Alien: Covenant, Tennessee "T" Faris (Danny McBride)
Ant-Man, Darren Cross / Yellowjacket (Corey Stoll)
Batman Begins, Ra's al Ghul (Ken Watanabe)
Collateral, Felix Reyes-Torrena (Javier Bardem)
The Counterfeiters, Sturmbannführer Herzog (Devid Striesow)
Cradle 2 the Grave, Anthony Fait (DMX)
Dancer in the Dark, Norman (Jean-Marc Barr)
Downfall, Heinrich Himmler (Ulrich Noethen)
Dragon, Liu Jinxi (Donnie Yen)
Dumb and Dumber To, Harry Dunne (Jeff Daniels)
ER, Al Boulet (Michael Beach)
Exit Wounds, Latrell Walker / Leon Rollins (DMX)
Fail Safe, Jimmy Pierce (Don Cheadle)
God of Gamblers II, Ko Chun (Chow Yun-fat)
Hugo, René Tabard (Michael Stuhlbarg)
The Ides of March, Paul Zara (Philip Seymour Hoffman)
Island of Lost Souls, Richard (Nicolaj Kopernikus)
The Karate Kid Part III, Terry Silver (Thomas Ian Griffith)
The Kingdom, Adam Leavitt (Jason Bateman)
Lara Croft: Tomb Raider, Alex West (Daniel Craig)
The Lookout, Lewis (Jeff Daniels)
Mad Max Beyond Thunderdome (2015 Supercharger edition), Dr. Dealgood (Edwin Hodgeman)
Magnolia, Officer Jim Kurring (John C. Reilly)
The Matrix Reloaded, Link (Harold Perrineau)
The Matrix Revolutions, Link (Harold Perrineau)
Mercenary for Justice, Chapel (Roger Guenveur Smith)
Midnight in Paris, Salvador Dalí (Adrien Brody)
Morbius, Adrian Toomes / Vulture (Michael Keaton)
NCIS: Los Angeles, Sam Hanna (LL Cool J)
Need for Speed, Bill Ingram (Stevie Ray Dallimore), Monarch (Michael Keaton)
Never Been Kissed, Augustus Strauss (John C. Reilly)
Nights in Rodanthe, Jack Willis (Christopher Meloni)
Only You, False Damon Bradley (Billy Zane)
Out of Africa, Berkeley Cole (Michael Kitchen)
Pawn Sacrifice, Boris Spassky (Liev Schreiber)
Personal Shopper, Ingo (Lars Eidinger)
Police Story (2012 Ultimate Blu-Ray edition), Counsellor Cheung (Lau Chi-wing)
Post Grad, Walter Malby (Michael Keaton)
The Punisher, Quentin Glass (Will Patton)
Rear Window (2012 Blu-Ray edition), Lars Thorwald (Raymond Burr)
Red Cliff, Lu Su (Hou Yong)
Rise of the Planet of the Apes, Chief John Hamil (Ty Olsson)
Run All Night, Detective Harding (Vincent D'Onofrio)
The Salton Sea, Danny Parker / Tom Van Allen (Val Kilmer)
Sarah's Key, William Rainsferd (Aidan Quinn)
Shoot 'Em Up, Hertz (Paul Giamatti)
Sicario, Matt Graver (Josh Brolin)
Spider-Man: Homecoming, Adrian Toomes / Vulture (Michael Keaton)
State of Play, Dominic Foy (Jason Bateman)
Super 8, Colonel Nelec (Noah Emmerich)
S.W.A.T., Lieutenant II Greg Velasquez (Reg E. Cathey)
Tomorrow Never Dies, Jack Wade (Joe Don Baker)
Trainspotting, Mikey Forrester (Irvine Welsh)
Velvet Goldmine, Jerry Devine (Eddie Izzard)
War for the Planet of the Apes, the Colonel (Woody Harrelson)
White House Farm, DCI Taff Jones (Stephen Graham)
The Wicker Man, Edward Malus (Nicolas Cage)

Animation
Adventure Time, Hunter Abadeer
The Adventures of Tintin, Thompson
Bambi II, Great Prince of the Forest
Cars 2, Rod "Torque" Redline
Cars 3, Sterling
Home Movies, Coach McGuirk
Ratchet & Clank, Clank
Regular Show, Benson
Tarzan, Jim Porter
Tom and Jerry: Shiver Me Whiskers, Red Parrot Stan
Wallace & Gromit: The Curse of the Were-Rabbit, Victor Quartermaine
Zootopia, Stu Hopps

References

External links
Official agency profile  
Tōru Ōkawa at Ryu's Seiyuu Infos

1968 births
Living people
Japanese male stage actors
Japanese male video game actors
Japanese male voice actors
Male voice actors from Kagoshima Prefecture
Mausu Promotion voice actors
Nihon University alumni
20th-century Japanese male actors
21st-century Japanese male actors